Trongsundet is a village in the municipality of Inderøy in Trøndelag county, Norway.

References

Mosvik
Inderøy
Villages in Trøndelag